"Stinkin' badges" is a paraphrase of a line of dialogue from the 1948 film The Treasure of the Sierra Madre. That line was in turn derived from dialogue in the 1927 novel of the same name, which was the basis for the film.

In 2005, the full quote from the film was chosen as #36 on the American Film Institute list, AFI's 100 Years...100 Movie Quotes. The shorter, better-known version of the quote was first heard in the 1967 episode of the TV series The Monkees "It's a Nice Place to Visit". It was also included in the 1974 Mel Brooks film Blazing Saddles, and has since been included in many other films and television shows.

History
The original version of the line appeared in B. Traven's novel The Treasure of the Sierra Madre (1927):

The line was popularized by John Huston's 1948 film adaptation of the novel, which was altered from its content in the novel to meet the Motion Picture Production Code regulations severely limiting profanity in film. In one scene, a Mexican bandit leader named "Gold Hat" (portrayed by Alfonso Bedoya) tries to convince Fred C. Dobbs (Humphrey Bogart) that he and his company are Federales:

Appearances in media

Comics
In one issue of the Teenage Mutant Ninja Turtles Archie comics, the Malignoid drones Scul and Bean meet with the nihilistic industrian Null to discuss the contract between him and the Malignoid queen Maligna. When Null insists on consolidating the contract through his lawyers, either Scul or Bean yells out: "Lawyers?! We don't need no stinkin' lawyers!!"
In the Teenage Mutant Ninja Turtles series from Image Comics, Donatello paraphrases a variation of that sentence ("Plans?! I don't need no stinking plans!") whilst using his cyborg systems to restore a stripped-down aircar.

Film
 In Mel Brooks's Western Blazing Saddles (1974), the line was delivered as "Badges? We don't need no stinking badges."
 In Charles Swenson's animated film Down and Dirty Duck (1974), a stereotypical Mexican mouse character, wearing a sombrero and a bandolier (probably in a parody of Speedy Gonzales), speaks the line as "I don't want your stinkin' badges!"
 In the film The Ninth Configuration (1980), when the asylum patients are quoting lines from movies, one quotes "Badges? We don't need no stinking badges."
 In the sketch-comedy film Elephant Parts (1981), one of the fake ad sequences portrays "an authentic Mexican bandito in a Mexican-American restaurant," whose sole line is "Nachos? We don't need no stinkin' nachos!"
 In the movie Gotcha! (1985), the character Manolo says "Don't show me your badges; we don't know nothing about no stinking badges."
 The movie Troop Beverly Hills (1989) contains the line "We don't need no stinkin' patches."
 In the "Weird Al" Yankovic film UHF (1989), when animal show host Raul (Trinidad Silva) is asked to take a consignment of badgers, he says "Badgers? Badgers?! We don't need no stinking badgers!"
 In the film Flashback (1990), as the hooker is undressing the FBI agent, she discards his badge saying "We don't need no stinkin' badges."
 In the  Ron Howard film Backdraft (1991), William Baldwin's character tries to refresh his nephew's memory by using a hand puppet to exclaim, "Spinach? We don't need no stinkin' spinach!"
 In the film No Code of Conduct (1998) Paul Gleason's character says in a bad Mexican accent "Badges? We don't need no stinkin' badges!", then goes on to sheepishly mention that he was quoting from the 1974 film Blazing Saddles.
 In the film Bubble Boy (2001), when Jimmy offers Danny Trejo's character Slim patches for his motorcycle's flat tire he responds, "Patches? I could use some stinking patches."
 In the film Zombie Strippers (2008), when Paco (Joey Medina) is told to obtain some wild animals to dispose of the bodies, he says, "Badgers? Badgers? We don't need no stinking badgers."
 In the film 6 Underground (2019), Three says the line while breaking into the enemy stronghold and going past the security desk.
 In Spike Lee's American war drama film Da 5 Bloods (2020), when Desroche's gunmen first try to dispossess the Bloods of the recovered gold bars, the leader of the gunmen tells Paul, "We don't need no stinking official badges."
 In the film "Fatherhood"(2021) Matt (Kevin Hart) and his daughter say "Rules? We don't need no stinkin' rules." many times throughout the film.

Games

 The trading card game Magic: the Gathering (1993) makes reference to a card that was to be included in the joke Unhinged set called, "We don't need no stinkin' Merfolk!"
 The game FTL: Faster Than Light (2012) includes an achievement called, "I don't need no stinkin' upgrades!"
 The game Ground Zero Texas (1993) has a dialog from actor Danny Trejo saying: "Badges, We don't need no stinking badges"
 In the adventure game Escape from Monkey Island (2000), the main protagonist Guybrush Threepwood is given a dialogue option, when asked for ID by the bartender, "ID? I don't need no stinkin' ID!"
 In the game Leisure Suit Larry 6: Shape Up or Slip Out! (1993), the main protagonist has the line of dialogue, "Badges? Ve don' need no steenkin' badges!" to Cavaricchi, the aerobics instructor.
 In the adventure game Sam & Max: Chariots of the Dogs (2008), when asked by the protagonists why their prisoners aren't being kept in cages, the mariachi Pedro responds "Cages? We don't got no cages. We don't have to show you any stinking cages."

Literature

 In the Stephen King novel It (1986), character Richie Tozier repeatedly says, in a poor imitation of a Mexican accent, "Batches? We don't need no steenking batches."
 In the Stephen King novel Bag of Bones the narrator describes his denial of having writer's block by saying to the reader "Writer's block? What writer's block? We don't got no stinking writer's block."
 The Luis Valdez play I Don't Have to Show You No Stinkin' Badges (1987) draws its title from this quote, and makes a specific reference to Sierra Madre.
 In Eldest (2005), the second novel in Christopher Paolini's The Inheritance Cycle series, a cobbler named Loring eschews the use of barges as a means of human transportation, saying, "Barges? We don't want no stinking barges."
 In William S. Burroughs' report on the 1968 Democratic Convention for Esquire magazine, Burroughs has a cop demand to see the permit of the candidate's entourage. The response is: "Permits? We don't have any permits. We don't have to show you any stinking permits. You are talking suh to the future President of America."

Music

 The song "Badges" (1984) by Minutemen quoted the line as: "We have no badges... we don't need no badges... we don't need no stinking badges".
 The song "Medicine Show" (1985) by Big Audio Dynamite sampled the quote by Alfonso Bedoya from the film The Treasure of the Sierra Madre. The song prominently featured quotes sampled from other westerns as well, including several by or making reference to the Eli Wallach character Tuco from the film The Good, the Bad and the Ugly. This association — as well as the similarity of voice and accent employed by both actors in their respective bandito roles — reinforces the common misconception that Wallach delivered the famous line.
 Julian Cope's semi-eponymous song "Julian H Cope" from his album Jehovahkill (1992) featured the line: "Badges? Badges? We don't need no stinkin' badges! So sissified, civilised, I want to be a savage".
 The 2 Skinnee J's song "The Good, the Bad, and The Skinnee" (1998) from the album SuperMercado! features the line "Badges, we don't need no stinking badges" sung as a refrain five times in a row.
 At the beginning of the song "Big Fat Money" off the album Balance by Van Halen, someone (probably Bruce Fairbairn) asked, "Al, you want a click on this one?" to which Alex Van Halen replied, "I don't need no stinkin' click!"
 The New York-based jamband Moe often uses the line humorously during a pause in their song "Mexico" when playing it live.
 The Roger Clyne and the Peacemakers song "Barons to Break," from the album Native Heart (2017), includes the line in the chorus.
The Ian Brown song "Little Seed, Big Tree" has the phrase at the beginning of the song.

Television
 In the episode "It's a Nice Place to Visit" (September 11, 1967) of The Monkees, Micky Dolenz delivers the line as "Badges? We don't need no stinking badges".
 In the episode "Filthy Pictures" (1980) of WKRP In Cincinnati, Johnny Fever is telling a story "I said show me some badges, and the guys says, Badges! uh, we don't need no stinking badges".
 In a 1983 episode of Wizards and Warriors, the character Marko (played by Walter Olkewicz) delivers a spoof of the line as "Badgers? We don't need no stinkin' badgers".
 In the episode "There Goes the Neighborhood" (December 3, 1985) of The A-Team, Murdock reacts to fake badges with "Badges? We don't need no stinkin' badges".
 In the episode "Sledge in Toyland"  (December 3, 1987) of Sledge Hammer!, Sledge and his partner arrive at the office of the murdered toy tycoon and the security guard sticks a visitor's badge on his chest. Sledge throws it on the counter saying: "Heeeey, I don't need no sticking badges."
 In the episode "Darkstar Rising" (2008) of Ben 10: Alien Force, when Kevin is lamenting the loss of his plumber's badge, Ben says, "Badges? We don't need no stinking badges."
 In a 2014 episode of Transformers: Rescue Bots, Kade Burns says "Badgers? We don't need no stinking badgers."
 In an episode (season 1, episode 2: "A Better Mousetrap") of the 2003 Teenage Mutant Ninja Turtles series, Michelangelo intones, "Chill, bro — we don't need no stinking surface world."
 In the Salute Your Shorts episode "The Treasure of Sara Madre" (1991), the gang is digging for buried treasure, and Z.Z. finds a junior park ranger's badge, about which Michael states, "Badges? We don't need no stinking badges!"
 In the Friends Season 8 episode "The One with the Baby Shower" (2002), the quote is mentioned as one of Joey's training questions for the show Bamboozled.
 In the "A Beautiful Mine" (2003) episode of The Adventures of Jimmy Neutron: Boy Genius, Sheen says, "Uh, Libby, I don't think they need no stinkin' badges." This entire episode is a parody of The Treasure of the Sierra Madre.
 In the "Stuck with Dick" episode (1998) of 3rd Rock from the Sun, Harry says "Bagels? Bagels? We don't need no stinkin' bagels!".
 In the "Ghost in the Machine," episode 82, season 3 (1986) of The Transformers, the Ghost of Starscream tells Decepticon guards Runabout and Runamuck by saying, "Passes?  Passes?  I don't have to show you no stinking passes!"
 In the TV movie Good Luck Charlie, It's Christmas!, when asked to see some identification badges, the leader of a group of live action video game players responded with "Badges? We don't need no stinkin' badges!"
 In the episode "Musta Been a Beautiful Baby" (Episode 28, October 13, 1993) of Adventures of Sonic the Hedgehog, Scratch and Grounder masquerade as police officers from the "Department of Lost Kids", and when asked for their badges, reply "Badges? We don't need no stinking—" before being cut off and thrown out.
 In the episode "Gumby with a Pokey" (Season 7, Episode 21, May 17, 2010) of Two and a Half Men, Berta and Charlie are quoting movies while high, and Berta says the line "Badges? We don't need no stinkin' badges!"  using a popsicle as a mustache.
 In the 43rd episode of Jessie, the episode is titled "We Don't Need No Stinkin' Badges".
 In the episode "Blood Drive" (Season 5, Episode 18, March 5, 2009) of The Office, Michael is talking at a Valentine's Day singles party and says "Relationships? We don’t need no stinkin’ relationships!"

Theatre

 In the Broadway production of American Idiot, between the songs "St. Jimmy" and "Give me Novocaine" the character, St. Jimmy, proclaims that "We don't need no stinkin' badges!" before Johnny and Whatsername initiate an intimate moment in the center stage bed.

References

External links
 

English phrases
Quotations from film
Badges
1940s neologisms